Smrečje may refer to:

 Smrečje, Croatia, a village near Čabar, Croatia
 Smrečje, Vrhnika, a settlement in the Municipality of Vrhnika, Slovenia
 Smrečje v Črni, a settlement in the Municipality of Kamnik, Slovenia